The List of Bellarmine College Prep alumni includes notable graduates of Bellarmine College Preparatory in San Jose, California

Arts and literature

Athletes

Business

Jesuit Priests

Law

Military

Politicians

Scientists

Miscellaneous Notability

References 

Alumni of Jesuit schools
Bellarmine College Preparatory alumni
Lists of American people by school affiliation
Alumni of Jesuit high schools in the United States